Ferojpora, also known as Ferojpura or Ferozpora, is a village in the Baramulla district of Jammu and Kashmir, India. Though Ferozpora Halqa on revenue records have been divided into two subdivisions, Ferozpora (a)(Gamadar) & Ferozpora (b)(Takipora). As a halqa it has few associated villages viz. Mohyen, Check Ferozpora, Drung, Chhanpora and Qazipora, but as a village it is relatively smaller covering about an area of 1 km2.

It is the birthplace of M.L.A Mr Mohammad Akbar Lone National Conference. and permanent residence of M.L.A Tangmarg  Dr Mustafa Kamal National Conference.

Economically it has been dependent markedly on Gulmarg tourism and is credited with R.B.A. (Resident of Backward Area) category on the basis of socially & economically backward area. The village is densely populated, with around 1500 houses.

Recently a big water filtration plant has been established in this village by Govt of Jammu and Kashmir that provides water to remote and surrounding area of  Tangmarg Town. The village is surrounded by forests from three side except from east. Due north lies the beautiful town of Tangmarg. Nalla-Ferozpora further adds to the beauty of village due south.
Climate is mostly cold so in May June July August, hot months making it a picnic area to beat the heat. The area is flooded with locals and tourists during the hot season. Water is mostly cold and fresh flow in streams attract people. Trout fish, a fresh water fish famously found in the area.

References

Villages in Baramulla district